Payson-Dixon line or Payson-Dixie line is an unofficial political boundary sometimes referred to in Utah politics. It refers to the area south of Payson, Utah, down to St. George, Utah which carries the nickname of Utah's Dixie. It is a pun on the well known Mason-Dixon line, that is an unofficial barrier that delineates where the American south begins.

Use and history 
While the term can be used with various connotations, it is usually used in reference to an urban-rural divide that exists in the Utah political sphere. Because 80% of Utah's population lives in the Wasatch Front, people used to acknowledge that rural issues are more relevant in southern Utah. It is also used as a point of pride for those who live south of it, while hardly used by those who live north of it (both uses are similar to the meanings of the Mason-Dixon Line from which it alludes.)

The origin of the term is unknown, but an early use appears in 1988 in St. George's newspaper: The Spectrum. It is being used regularly by 1993, with Utah State representative Met Johnson [R-UT-74] using the term in opinion pieces and other settings expressing his concern of the growing divide. The terms use in Utah politics, continues with use throughout the 2000s and became important again in the 2012 US House of Representatives Election, with the creation of Utah Congressional District 4. With the 2010 census, CD4 was created and then Rep. Jim Matheson, elected to run in that newly created district, rather than the one he was then listed as representing. Rep. Chris Stewart used the term against his opponent, Jay Seegmiller, in the race, saying as he didn't live in the district, he couldn't understand the needs of people south of Payson-Dixon line.

It has been used frequently in 2018, and 2019 by Utah (then Lt.) Governor Spencer Cox in keynotes, tweets, podcasts, and other public situations to advocate for Southern Utah. Being from the area himself, he has used it in the context of his then role as Lt. Governor, as well as his 2020 Gubernatorial campaign, in which he used it throughout his tour of the 248 incorporated cities in Utah, especially those in the rural south. He has continued use of the term as governor, as recently as his 2021 State of the State speech to argue for his budget proposal, saying In Utah, it shouldn’t matter what side of I-15 you were born on — or in my case, on what side of the Payson-Dixon line you happen to live — every child in this state deserves a great education from a high-quality, well-compensated teacher.

References

External links 
 Bumpkinism is forever (a 2004 Opinion Piece defining the term)

Regions of Utah